Air Chief Marshal Mark Donald Binskin,  (born 20 March 1960) is a former senior officer in the Royal Australian Air Force. He served as Chief of Air Force (2008–11), Vice Chief of the Defence Force (2011–14), and Chief of the Defence Force from June 2014 until his retirement in July 2018. In February 2020 he was appointed as a Commissioner and Chairman of the Royal Commission into National Natural Disaster Arrangements. He is the current chair of the Civil Aviation Safety Authority of Australia

Early life
Binskin was born on 20 March 1960 in Sydney and grew up in Campbelltown, New South Wales. He attended Campbelltown Public School, and completed secondary schooling at Hurlstone Agricultural High School.

Military career
Binskin joined the Royal Australian Navy (RAN) in May 1978, and on completion of flying training was posted to fly A-4G Skyhawk aircraft at Naval Air Station HMAS Albatross. In January 1982, he was selected as the first RAN pilot to undergo an exchange with the Royal Australian Air Force (RAAF), flying Mirage III aircraft. On completion of this exchange, and with the disbanding of the Navy's fixed wing capability, he transferred to the RAAF in 1984.

Binskin served as the Commanding Officer of No. 77 Squadron at Williamtown during the period 1998 and 1999, and later Commander of Air Combat Group from 2004 until 2005.

Binskin's flying qualifications include Fighter Combat Instructor and Tactical Reconnaissance Pilot. Additionally, he has served as the RAAF F/A-18 Hornet Demonstration Pilot, and in this position represented the RAAF throughout Australia, Indonesia, Malaysia, Singapore and New Zealand, and has over 3,500 hours in single-seat fighter aircraft. He was awarded a Member of the Order of Australia for his performance in these two positions.

During the Australian contribution to the 2003 invasion of Iraq, Binskin served as Chief of Staff at Headquarters Australian Theatre. Following this, he served as the first dedicated non-United States Air Force Director of the US Central Air Force Combined Air and Space Operations Centre, where he was responsible for the conduct of all Coalition air operations in support of Operation Iraqi Freedom and Operation Enduring Freedom (ADF operations Catalyst and Slipper). For his leadership capabilities in this appointment, he was awarded a Commendation for Distinguished Service.

Binskin was appointed to the position of Air Commander Australia on 26 July 2007. He assumed the position of Chief of the Air Force (CAF) on 4 July 2008; upon assuming this appointment, he was promoted to air marshal on 4 July 2008.

Binskin was appointed an Officer of the Order of Australia in the 2010 Queens Birthday Honours for distinguished service to the Australian Defence Force in senior command and staff appointments. He has additionally been honoured with Singapore's Meritorious Service Medal, and the Gugseon Medal of the Order of National Security Merit from South Korea.

On 1 June 2011, it was announced that Binskin would be appointed Vice Chief of the Defence Force (VCDF) from 4 July for a term of three years in the Defence leadership change over. For his "eminent service to the Australian Defence Force" as CAF and VCDF, Binskin was advanced to a Companion of the Order of Australia in the 2014 Australia Day Honours.

On 4 April 2014, Prime Minister Tony Abbott announced that Binskin will take over as Chief of the Defence Force (CDF) when General David Hurley's term expires on 4 July 2014 and the current Chief of the Navy, Vice Admiral Ray Griggs will replace him as VCDF. The change of command occurred slightly earlier than advised, with Binskin promoted to air chief marshal and appointed CDF during a ceremony on 30 June.

Personal life
Binskin is married to Gitte. They have two sons. His interests include camping, motor sports, dancing and motorcycle riding.

Honours and awards

References

External links

Royal Australian Air Force Biography
Defence Leaders' Biography
Official photo (copyright)

1960 births
Air Commanders (Australia)
Australian aviators
Australian military personnel of the Iraq War
Chiefs of the Defence Force (Australia)
Companions of the Order of Australia
Living people
People from Sydney
Recipients of the Commendation for Distinguished Service
Recipients of the Pingat Jasa Gemilang (Tentera)
Royal Australian Air Force air marshals
Royal Australian Navy officers
Vice Chiefs of the Defence Force (Australia)
Military personnel from New South Wales
Commandeurs of the Légion d'honneur
Recipients of the Darjah Utama Bakti Cemerlang (Tentera)
Commanders of the Order of Orange-Nassau